Charles Oliver Hough  (born January 5, 1948) is an American former Major League Baseball (MLB) knuckleball pitcher and coach who played for the Los Angeles Dodgers, Texas Rangers, Chicago White Sox, and Florida Marlins from 1970 to 1994.

Playing career

Amateur
Hough was drafted out of Hialeah High School in the 8th round of the 1966 Major League Baseball draft by the Los Angeles Dodgers. While in high school, he had spent the summer of 1964 pitching against collegiate competition for the Chatham A's of the Cape Cod Baseball League where he was named a league all-star.

Minor leagues
After pitching in the low minor leagues from 1967 to 1969 with the Ogden Dodgers, Santa Barbara Dodgers and Albuquerque Dodgers with limited success, Hough's career and fortunes changed dramatically when he learned how to throw a knuckleball in spring training in 1970, leading to a successful season with the Spokane Indians in AAA, where he led the Pacific Coast League in saves and posted a 1.95 ERA.

Los Angeles Dodgers
He made his major league debut against the Pittsburgh Pirates in 1970 but did not join the Dodgers bullpen full-time until the 1973 season. He became a top reliever for the Dodgers from 1973 until he was sold to the Texas Rangers in 1980. With the Dodgers, he was one of the pitchers who served up one of the three home runs that New York Yankees slugger Reggie Jackson hit on three straight pitches in Game 6 of the 1977 World Series.

Texas Rangers
He was converted into a starting pitcher in Texas, where he pitched from 1980 to 1990, making his only All-Star team in 1986. He was famous for his "dancing knuckleball" pitch that he threw around 80% of the time. Hough complemented his knuckleball with a fastball and slider. Hough was well known for throwing a large number of complete games each season and led the league in 1984 with 17. In his last complete game of the season, the opposing pitcher, Mike Witt of the California Angels, hurled a perfect game.

In 1987, Hough, in battery with Geno Petralli, put Petralli in the record books as Petralli committed four passed balls in one inning to tie the major league record of Ray Katt, catching knuckleballer Hoyt Wilhelm in 1954.  The record was later tied by Ryan Lavarnway of the Boston Red Sox in 2013, catching  knuckleballer Steven Wright in his first major league start.

Chicago White Sox
He pitched for the Chicago White Sox from 1991 to 1992, where, at 43 years old, he was teammates with 43-year-old Carlton Fisk.

Florida Marlins
He joined the expansion Florida Marlins for the 1993 season and started the first regular season game in team history, on April 5, pitching six innings for the win as the Marlins defeated the Dodgers 6–3.  He retired at age 46 after the 1994 season. He was the last active player to have been born in the 1940s.

Career totals
During a 25-season career, Hough compiled 216 wins, 2,362 strikeouts and a 3.75 earned run average. His 216 wins rank 86th all-time on the all-time win list, tied with Wilbur Cooper and Curt Schilling. However, Hough also recorded 216 losses, making him the winningest pitcher in history to have lost as many games as he won.

Coaching career
1996–1998: Pitching coach for the San Bernardino Stampede
1998–1999: Pitching coach for the Los Angeles Dodgers
2001–2002: Pitching coach for the New York Mets
2006: Pitching coach for the Fullerton Flyers
2007–2010: Pitching coach for the Inland Empire 66ers

See also

 List of knuckleball pitchers
 List of Major League Baseball career wins leaders
 List of Major League Baseball career strikeout leaders
 List of Major League Baseball single-inning strikeout leaders
 List of Texas Rangers Opening Day starting pitchers
 List of Major League Baseball career hit batsmen leaders

References

External links

   

1948 births
Living people
Albuquerque Dodgers players
Albuquerque Dukes players
American League All-Stars
Arizona Instructional League Dodgers players
Baseball players from Honolulu
Chatham Anglers players
Chicago White Sox players
Florida Marlins players
Knuckleball pitchers
Leones del Caracas players
American expatriate baseball players in Venezuela
Los Angeles Dodgers coaches
Los Angeles Dodgers players
Major League Baseball pitchers
Major League Baseball pitching coaches
New York Mets coaches
Ogden Dodgers players
Oklahoma City 89ers players
Santa Barbara Dodgers players
Spokane Indians players
Texas Rangers players
Tigres del Licey players
American expatriate baseball players in the Dominican Republic